Jim Henson's Animal Show is an American children's television series from the Jim Henson Company that aired from October 3, 1994, to June 28, 1998. The show premiered as part of The Fox Cubhouse for its first two seasons. The show later moved to Animal Planet with its third season released as early as February 18, 1998.

Plot
Stinky the Skunk and Jake the Polar Bear host a talk show where they interview two different species of animals per show. Some episodes interview only one animal. The interviewees talk about themselves, as video clips are played of real animals of the same species.

References

External links
 

1994 American television series debuts
1998 American television series endings
1990s American children's television series
BBC children's television shows
Fox Kids
Animal Planet original programming
Nature educational television series
Seven Network original programming
American television shows featuring puppetry
Television series about bears
Television series by The Jim Henson Company
English-language television shows